Leslie Gibson may refer to:
 Leslie Gibson (judge)
 Leslie Gibson (artist)